Beacon Hill Park is a 75 ha (200 acre) park located along the shore of Juan de Fuca Strait in Victoria, British Columbia.  The park is popular both with tourists and locals, and contains a number of amenities including woodland and shoreline trails, two playgrounds, a waterpark, playing fields, a petting zoo, tennis courts, many ponds, and landscaped gardens. The traditional name of the hill is Meeacan (sometimes spelled Meegan) to the Songhees people, meaning "belly."

The land was originally set aside as a protected area by Sir James Douglas, governor of the Colony of Vancouver Island in 1858.  In 1882, the land was officially made a municipal park of the City of Victoria, and given its present name.  The name is derived from a small hill overlooking the Strait, upon which once stood navigational beacons.  The hill is culturally significant, having been a burial site for the First Nations Coast Salish people, who are the original inhabitants of the Greater Victoria region.  It provides scenic vistas of the Strait and the Olympic Mountains of Washington.

Although much of the park has been landscaped into gardens and playing fields, and populated with various structures, a great deal of the native flora has been preserved.  Garry oak, arbutus, Douglas-fir, western redcedar, camas, trillium, snowberry, Oregon grape, and fawn lily still remain in the park.  Raccoons, river otters, squirrels, and many types of birds are frequently to be seen.  The ponds in the park are noted for their swans, turtles, ducks, Canada geese, and blue herons.

The park is notable for a few human-made features, as well.  Most prominent is the world's fourth-tallest totem pole, a  work carved by Kwakwaka'wakw craftsman Mungo Martin, and erected in 1956 and was when built, the world's tallest. The pebble bridge over the stream between Goodacre and Fountain Lake is a tribute to renowned BC artist Emily Carr, erected by her sister Alice Carr in 1945. In the middle of the park, the Cameron Bandshell, otherwise known as "The Stage", is the site of concerts from June through September.  "Mile 0" of the Trans-Canada Highway is at the south-west corner of the park, along  with the old Beacon Lodge and the famous Beacon Drive In.

Amenities
Horticulture: 1
Playgrounds: 2
Concession: 1
Picnic: 1
Washrooms: 3
Ball Diamond: 1
Sports Fields: 2
Tennis Court: 3
Off Leash: 1
Trails: 1
Waterview: 1
Lawn Bowling: 1

References

External links

A History of Beacon Hill Park by Janis Ringuette
Great Blue Herons in Beacon Hill Park by Jim Chapman
The Friends of Beacon Hill Park website
High Resolution Photograph of the Beacon Hill Totem Pole
Satellite Image from Google Maps
Parks CSV

Parks in Victoria, British Columbia